Oakdale is a city in Allen Parish in south Louisiana, United States. The population was 7,780 at the 2010 census.

Oakdale was founded as "Dunnsville" by William T. Dunn. The history of Allen Parish is preserved at the Leatherwood Museum, which reopened on September 27, 2008, in a renovated facility at 202 E. 7th Ave. in Oakdale.

Geography
Oakdale's closest neighbor in Allen Parish is Elizabeth, located just west of Oakdale.

Demographics

2020 census

As of the 2020 United States census, there were 6,692 people, 2,112 households, and 1,418 families residing in the city.

2000 census
As of the census of 2000, there were 8,137 people, 2,246 households, and 1,525 families residing in the city. The racial makeup of the city was 62.07% White, 34.94% African American, 0.57% Native American, 1.23% Asian, 0.01% Pacific Islander, 0.33% from other races, and 0.85% from two or more races. Hispanic or Latino of any race were 12.22% of the population.

There were 2,246 households, out of which 34.5% had children under the age of 18 living with them, 40.6% were married couples living together, 23.0% had a female householder with no husband present, and 32.1% were non-families. 29.0% of all households were made up of individuals, and 13.7% had someone living alone who was 65 years of age or older. The average household size was 2.54 and the average family size was 3.13.

In the city, the population was spread out, with 21.2% under the age of 18, 10.3% from 18 to 24, 38.6% from 25 to 44, 18.3% from 45 to 64, and 11.6% who were 65 years of age or older. The median age was 34 years. For every 100 females, there were 157.4 males. For every 100 females age 18 and over, there were 179.2 males.

The median income for a household in the city was $22,826, and the median income for a family was $28,506. Males had a median income of $32,179 versus $16,039 for females. The per capita income for the city was $10,288. About 21.7% of families and 23.4% of the population were below the poverty line, including 25.1% of those under age 18 and 22.9% of those age 65 or over.

Notable people
Leroy Johnson, posthumous recipient of the Medal of Honor
Coleman Lindsey, former lieutenant governor of Louisiana
Bill Dodd, former lieutenant governor of Louisiana 
Mary Evelyn Parker, former Louisiana State Treasurer 
E. Holman Jones, former Louisiana State Representative
R.C. Slocum, former head football coach at Texas A&M

Education
Allen Parish School Board operates public schools:
Oakdale High School
Oakdale Middle School
Oakdale Elementary School

Notable facilities
Oakdale is home to the Oakdale Federal Correctional Complex.

In April 2009, the Roy O. Martin Lumber Company, doing business as Martco, unveiled a  $200 million oriented-strand-board plant near Oakdale. The largest plant of its kind in the world, the facility initially employed 170 persons, according to company president Roy O. Martin, III.

References

External links
 Oakdale Federal Correctional Complex

Cities in Louisiana
Cities in Allen Parish, Louisiana
Cities in the Central Louisiana